is a railway station located in the city of Ōdate, Akita Prefecture, Japan, operated by the East Japan Railway Company (JR East).

Lines

Station layout
The station was built with an island platform, but only one side of the platform is in use, thus making the station a single side platform serving bi-directional traffic. The station is unattended.

History
Ōgita Station was opened on July 1, 1914 on the privately owned Akita Railways, serving the town of Ōgita, Akita. The line was nationalized on June 1, 1934, becoming part of the Japanese Government Railways (JGR) system, which became the Japan National Railways (JNR) after World War II. The station was absorbed into the JR East network upon the privatization of the JNR on April 1, 1987. The station has been unattended since April 2003.

Passenger statistics
In fiscal 2001, the station was used by an average of 103 passengers daily (boarding passengers only).

Surrounding area
  Bypass

See also
 List of Railway Stations in Japan

References

External links

 JR East Station information 

Railway stations in Japan opened in 1914
Railway stations in Akita Prefecture
Stations of East Japan Railway Company
Ōdate
Hanawa Line